HMS Paladin was a P-class destroyer of the Royal Navy that served in the Second World War. She was built by John Brown and Co. Ltd., Clydebank. She saw action in the Mediterranean and Far East. After the war she was converted into a type 16 frigate and was eventually scrapped in 1962.

Design
The P-class (and the preceding O-class) destroyers were designed prior to the outbreak of the Second World War to meet the Royal Navy's need for large numbers of destroyers in the event of war occurring. They were an intermediate between the large destroyers designed for fleet operations (such as the Tribal-class) and the smaller and slower Hunt-class escort destroyers. It was originally planned for both classes of destroyers to have a main gun armament of 4.7 inch (120 mm ) guns, but supply problems with the 4.7 inch mounts resulted in the decision to complete the eight P-class ships with 4-inch (102 mm) dual purpose (capable of both anti-ship and anti-aircraft fire) guns.

Displacement was  standard and  full load. The ship had a crew of 176 officers and men.

Paladin had a main gun armament of five 4-inch (102 mm) QF Mark V anti-aircraft guns in single mounts. Close-in anti-aircraft armament of one quadruple 2-pounder "pom-pom" mount together with four single Oerlikon 20 mm cannon, with two on the bridge wings and two further aft abreast the searchlight platform. A single quadruple 21-inch (533 mm) torpedo tubes was carried, while a second bank of four tubes was later added instead of one of the 4-inch guns. Four depth charge throwers were fitted, with 70 depth charges carried.

Construction and service

Paladin was laid down at John Brown's Clydebank shipyard on 22 July 1940, launched on 11 June 1941 and completed on 12 December of that year.

First time in the Far East
Paladin was allocated to the Eastern Fleet which was then under the command of Admiral Sir James Somerville, leaving Greenock on 17 February 1942, arriving in Colombo via the Cape on 24 March, where she joined the 12th Destroyer Flotilla. Paladin, together with the destroyer  and the cruiser  rescued 1122 survivors from the two ships, many of whom were in the water for 30 hours in a shark-infested sea.

In the first week of May 1942, Paladin took part in Operation Ironclad, the capture of Diego Suarez, Madagascar, from Vichy French forces, forming part of the screen for the heavy ships, and after resistance at Diego Suarez collapsed on 7 May, entered Diego Suarez harbour with Panther, the battleship  and the cruiser .

First time in the Mediterranean
Following the completion of Operation Ironclad, Paladin was transferred to the Mediterranean Fleet, arriving at Alexandria on 13 June 1942. Shortly after arrival in the Mediterranean, she formed part of the covering force for Operation Vigorous, the passage of a convoy to Malta from Alexandria; at the same time, Operation Harpoon, the passage of another convoy from the west, sailed from Gibraltar. While the latter got through, the Vigorous convoy was prevented from doing so by the appearance of the Italian battle fleet, coupled with heavy air attacks. On 14 September, Paladin, along with the destroyers Pakenham, Javelin and Jervis and the cruiser Dido, bombarded the Daba area.

Paladin also took part in other Mediterranean operations, including the passage of convoys to Malta from Egypt after the relief of the island in November, and providing anti-aircraft protection for Alexandria. On 17 February 1943, Paladin was part of the escort of a convoy between Tripoli and Alexandria. Paladin detected the submarine on her sonar and dropped a pattern of five depth charges. These badly damaged the submarine, forcing its commander to surface the submarine. On surfacing U-205 was attacked by a Bisley aircraft of 15 Squadron of the South African Air Force, and came under heavy fire from Paladin and the destroyer Jervis, forcing her crew to quickly abandon ship and disrupting attempts to scuttle the submarine. Paladin and Jervis picked up 42 survivors, while a boarding party from Paladin attempted to recover codebooks from U-205, with the submarine's short signal code book and bigram tables recovered. The corvette  took U-205 in tow, but the submarine sank under tow before reaching the shore.

From early 1943, the British intensified attempts to stop supply traffic from Italy to the German and Italian forces in North Africa, with operations including patrols by destroyers. On 8 March 1943, Paladin and Pakenham sank several ferry barges near Pantellaria. The Italian torpedo boats engaged the two British destroyers while the rest of the convoy escaped. In the ensuing action, the Battle of the Cigno Convoy, Cigno was sunk and Cassiopea  damaged, but Pakenham was hit several times by Italian shells which cut her steam lines and flooded her engine room. Paladin took her in tow, but after being attacked by enemy aircraft, Paladin was ordered to scuttle Pakenham, and sank her with torpedoes.

On 7 May, Paladin, with Jervis and Nubian bombarded Kelibia, the most easterly point of the Cape Bon peninsula. This bombardment was repeated on 9 May.

Paladin was among the ships which bombarded Pantellaria on 1 June, on the night of 2/3 June and on 5 June 1943, prior to the main assault on that island on 11 June, when Paladin escorted the landing force. The island surrendered without further fighting.

Sicily
Paladin formed part of the reserve covering force, Force Z, that waited to the West of Sicily during Operation Husky, the Anglo American invasion of Sicily on 10 July 1943.

Italy
In September 1943, she took part in operations connected with the invasion of the Italian mainland and the landings at Taranto, Operation Slapstick on 9 September, and after the fast minelayer  was sunk by a mine in Taranto harbour, Paladin served as headquarters ship and guardship at Taranto. On 26 November, Paladin, together with the cruiser  and the destroyers  and  shelled targets north of the Garigliano river. Paladin also carried out bombardments in the Gulf of Gaeta on 1 December.

The Far East
In January 1944, Paladin returned to eastern waters as part of a major reinforcement of the Eastern Fleet, joining the 16th Destroyer Flotilla, arriving in Trincomalee on 28 January, escorting the battleships ,  and the aircraft carrier .

On 12 February 1944, Paladin, together with Petard and the cruiser  were escorting the troop convoy KR 8 from Kilindini to Ceylon (Sri Lanka) through the One and a Half Degree Channel in the Maldives, when the  torpedoed and sank the troop ship , with heavy loss of life (up to 1300 were killed). I-27 was eventually torpedoed and sunk by Petard. The flooding meant that Paladin was in danger of sinking, with her crew jettisoning topweight, including the ship's torpedoes and transferring half her crew, and the survivors she had picked up from Khedive Ismail to Petard in order to control her list before being towed by Petard to Addu Atoll.

After temporary repair at Addu Atoll, Paladin was ordered to Simonstown in South Africa, where she arrived on 22 March 1944 to receive full repairs and a refit. Departing from Durban on 29 July, she returned to escort duties in the Indian Ocean, via Diego Suarez (Antsiranana), Madagascar and Dar es Salaam.

The Far East revisited
In January 1945, Paladin joined Force 65 for the landing of 500 Royal Marines on Cheduba island on 26 January, providing gunfire support for the landings, although the Marines found that the island was deserted. In February she took part in Operation Block, to prevent the escape of Japanese troops from Ramree Island. While Paladin received only minor splinter damage, a near miss badly damaged Pathfinder, which was later written off as not worth repairing. 

In March 1945, Paladins duties included escorting troopships, and on 26–30 April took part in Operation Bishop, a bombardment of Car Nicobar and Port Blair in the Andaman and Nicobar Islands by the heavy ships of the Eastern Fleet, with Paladin escorting the oiler Olwen. In May 1945, she took part in Operation Dracula, the Anglo-Indian landings at Rangoon. Haguro was eventually sunk by other destroyers on 16 May. On 5 June Paladin took part in sweeps in the Nicobar Channel, with Paladin and  sinking a Japanese landing craft off Sumatra.

In the last week of July, Paladin took part in Operation Livery, the object of which was removing mines near Phuket Island and the Malay Peninsula and bombarding appropriate targets. 

At the end of August, after the Japanese surrender, Paladin was included in the force that proceeded to Penang, which was occupied on 3 September 1945 in Operation Jurist. A platoon of crew members was sent ashore to help maintain order and prevent looting in George Town after the Japanese withdrawal.

Home, conversion and scrapping

Paladin left the East Indies Station in October 1945, arriving in Portsmouth in November 1945 and was placed in reserve. In January 1946, she replaced the old destroyer  as submarine target ship. On 24 August 1946, the Dutch motorship  was in collision with the French freighter Ernest L. Dawson in the English Channel. Paladin towed Nigerstroom to Spithead, leaving the damaged ship in the care of two tugs while the destroyer took 40 passengers from Nigerstroom to Portsmouth. Paladin continued serving as a target ship until March 1947 when she was laid up at Harwich in Category B2 reserve. In September 1951, Paladin was refitted at Chatham, remaining in Category II reserve at Chatham after completion of this refit.

In 1953–1954, Paladin was converted to a Type 16 fast anti-submarine frigate at Rosyth Dockyard. The ship's main gun armament was removed and replaced by a single QF 4-inch naval gun Mk XVI mount directed by a Simple Tachymetric Director, while close-in anti-aircraft armament consisted of five 40mm Bofors, with one twin Mk 5 mount amidships, and three single Mk 7 mounts on the bridge wings and on the ship's quarterdeck. Anti submarine armament consisted of two Squid ASW mortars, while a single quadruple 21-inch torpedo-tube mount was retained, giving an anti-surface ship capability, although the hoped for anti-submarine homing torpedoes failed to become available. A Type 293Q surface/air search radar and Type 974 navigation sonar was fitted, while the sonar outfit consisted of Type 146B search, Type 147P depth finder, Type 162 target classification and Type 174 Squid control. After completion of this refit, Paladin returned to reserve. Paladin was converted to a minelayer in 1957, with the remaining torpedo tubes and three of the Bofors guns removed to allow up to 30 mines to be carried. Displacement was now  standard and  full load.

On 10 January 1958, Paladin commissioned as part of the Nore Local Squadron, with duties including fishery protection patrols near Iceland. The Queen and the Duke of Edinburgh paid a state visit to the Netherlands in the royal yacht  in March 1958, Paladin was one of the escorts for the passage to Amsterdam. In May the same year Paladin fired a 21 gun salute when she and two other frigates took over escort duties outside French territorial waters from the French destroyer .

She was placed on the disposal list in 1961, and arrived at Dunston, Tyne and Wear for scrapping by Clayton and Davie on 22 October 1962.

Battle honours
Paladin was awarded the following battle honours: 'Diego Suarez 1942', 'Mediterranean 1943', 'Sicily 1943' and 'Burma 1944–45'.

Notes

Citations

References
 
 
 
 
 
 
 
 
 
 
 
 
 
 
 
 
 
 
 
 
 
 
 
 
 
 

 

1941 ships
Ships built on the River Clyde
Cold War destroyers of the United Kingdom
Cold War frigates of the United Kingdom
O and P-class destroyers
Type 16 frigates
World War II destroyers of the United Kingdom